Choró is a municipality located in the Brazilian state of Ceara. Its population was 13,565 (2020). The municipality has a surface area of approximately 792,7 km².

Neighborhoods 

List of neighborhoods in Choró:

 Barbada - Farm
 Barreira Branca – Small Farm
 Boa Vista - Farm
 Caicarinha - District
 Centro - Seat
 Feijão - Settlement
 Maravilha - District
 Monte Castelo - District
 Olho D'agua – Small Farm
 Piemonte - Settlement
 Poço do Barro - Farm
 Santa Rita - Village
 São João - Settlement
 São José- Farm
 São Mateus – Small Farm
 Serra da Palha
 Serra do Teixeira
 Teodosio - Farm

References

External links
 Choró Government Information Portal

Municipalities in Ceará